FOB Zeebrugge is a former International Security Assistance Force (ISAF) Forward Operating Base (FOB) initially operated by the British Army and the Royal Marines under Operation Herrick (OP H) before being transferred to the United States Marine Corps and located in Sangin District, Helmand Province, Afghanistan.

Units
 OP H VII (November 2007 - April 2008)
40 Commando, Royal Marines
 Charlie Company
 June 2010 - November 2010
 3rd Battalion, 12th Marine Regiment
 India Battery
From November 2010 - May 2011
 1st Battalion, 10th Marine Regiment
Bravo Battery
From May 2011 to November 2011
 2nd Battalion, 12th Marine Regiment
Echo Battery
 1st Battalion, 12th Marine Regiment
 2nd Platoon, Charlie Battery
 From November 2011 - May 2012                                                                 
 2nd Battalion, 11th Marine Regiment
 Golf Battery
 From May 2012
 2nd Battalion, 10th Marines
 Fox Battery
 1st Battalion, 1st Marines (later joined by 1st Squad, 2nd Platoon)
 3rd Platoon Alpha Company
 2nd Battalion, 7th Marines
 1st Battalion, 8th Marines

Observation Posts Athens and Shrine were nearby.

See also
List of ISAF installations in Afghanistan

References

Citations

Bibliography

Military bases of the United Kingdom in Afghanistan